Eden Garden is a garden in Mt Eden, Auckland set in 2 hectares of former quarry land.  It was established in 1964 and is open to the public for an admission fee. Eden Garden was donated to the people of New Zealand in 1965 and is managed by The Eden Garden Society, Inc., a not-for-profit society.

The garden's many collections of plants include what is reputed to be the largest collection of camellias in New Zealand, vireyas (tropical rhododendrons) some of which are always in bloom,  Japanese maples, magnolias, hibiscus, bromeliads, native trees, interesting rock formations, waterfalls, and a spectacular perennial garden. In recent years the annual spring Eden Garden Tulip Festival, held over a weekend in late August/early September at least since 2011, has been one of the biggest and best in Auckland. There is always something of interest in bloom. This little oasis close to the heart of Auckland city is described by New Zealand's  bestgardening.com website as "one of the loveliest and most tranquil inner city gardens around."

References

External links

 Photographs of Eden Garden held in Auckland Libraries' heritage collections.

Parks in Auckland
Gardens in the Auckland Region
Urban forests in New Zealand